Fire-fighting sport is a sport discipline developed in the Soviet Union in 1937. It includes a competition between various fire fighting teams in fire fighting-related exercises, such as climbing stairs in a mock-up house, unfolding a water hose, and extinguishing a fire using hoses or extinguishers. International competitions have taken place since 1968.
The VII Worldwide Championship in Fire and Rescue Sports took place in Cottbus, Germany, from 31 August to 5 September 2011.
First international competitions among juniors were conducted on 7–9 August 2010 in Kazan, Tatarstan. The next international junior contest was held in 2011 in Saint Petersburg.

See also
Czech fire sport

References
Fire-fighting sport 
  
 International Sport Federation of Firefighters and Rescuers

Firefighting
Sports originating in Russia
Soviet inventions